"Lasting Lover" is a song performed by British DJ Sigala and British singer and songwriter James Arthur. It was also written by Scottish singer-songwriter Lewis Capaldi, widely known for his hit "Someone You Loved". It was released to digital retailers and streaming platforms on 4 September 2020 by Ministry of Sound. The song samples "Time to Pretend" by indie pop and rock band MGMT. It reached number 10 on the UK Singles Chart and the top 10 of the US Dance/Electronic Songs chart.

At the APRA Music Awards of 2022, the song was nominated for Most Performed International Work.

Personnel
Credits adapted from Tidal.
 Bruce Fielder – lyricist, primary artist, production
 James Arthur – lyricist, vocals
 Jarly – lyricist, production
 Lewis Capaldi – lyricist, executive production
 Andrew VanWyngarden – lyricist
 Ben Goldwasser – lyricist
 Corey Sanders – lyricist
 Luke Fitton – lyricist
 Dipesh Parmar – editing, programming
 Paul Whalley – guitar
 Mark Ralph – mix engineering
 Milly McGregor – violin

Charts

Weekly charts

Year-end charts

Certifications

Release history

References

2020 singles
2020 songs
Arista Records singles
James Arthur songs
Ministry of Sound singles
Sigala songs
Songs written by James Arthur
Songs written by Sigala
Songs written by Lewis Capaldi
Songs written by Andrew VanWyngarden
Songs written by Benjamin Goldwasser